Les Villages Vovéens (literally The Voves' Villages) is a commune in the Eure-et-Loir department of northern France. The municipality was established on 1 January 2016 by merger of the former communes of Voves, Montainville, Rouvray-Saint-Florentin and Villeneuve-Saint-Nicolas.

Population

See also 
Communes of the Eure-et-Loir department

References 

Communes of Eure-et-Loir